Derussification (or derussianization) is a process or public policy in different states of the former Russian Empire and the Soviet Union or certain parts of them, aimed at restoring national identity of indigenous peoples: their language, culture and historical memory, lost due to Russification. The term can be also used to describe the marginalization of the language, culture and other attributes of the Russian-speaking society through the promotion of other, usually autochthonous, languages and cultures.

After the collapse of the Russian Empire 
For the first time, Derussification manifested itself in the newly independent states that emerged after the collapse of the Russian Empire in 1917, such as Poland, Finland, Georgia, Estonia, Latvia, and Lithuania. In this case, it often constituted discrimination against the Russian language as a reaction of the peoples conquered in the past to a period of intense (sometimes violent) Russification.

Kars 

After the Treaty of Moscow (1921) finally transferred the Kars Oblast and a number of adjacent territories to Turkey, almost all Christians, who made up 47% of the population according to the 1897 census, left these territories. The share of Slavs in the region, which at that time was 10.6% of the population (including 7.7% of Russians proper), dropped to zero. The Greek, Armenian and Georgian communities ceased to exist.

Harbin Russians 

In the period between 1945 and 1969, the derussification of Harbin ended, which at the peak of White emigration during the 1920s had an almost 300-thousand Russian-speaking population in Northeast China. Most of the remaining Russian residents chose to migrate to the United States, Australia, or returned to the USSR.

In the USSR 
In the first years of Soviet power, a mechanism of indigenization was launched in many nationally autonomous entities of the USSR, which was designed to protect the special interests of the titular nations. Therefore, despite the promotion of the Russian language as a means of interethnic communication, began the demographic decline of the Russian population in most national autonomies with the parallel growth of various national diasporas in Russia itself.

Thus, in the context of the population explosion in the Asian national republics of the USSR, Russians began to be actively displaced from all spheres of education and employment (except for more complex technical professions) even in those regions where they constituted the vast majority, such as Bishkek and Almaty. The growth of internal migration also led to increased competition for land and housing. Under these conditions, from the end of the 1960s, the Russian population basically began a gradual process of repatriation to the territory of the RSFSR.

Sino-Soviet Split 
After the Sino-Soviet split, the Ministry of Public Security and the State Bureau of Surveying and Mapping in 1963 issued the document "Notice on Requesting Investigation and Research on Issues Existing in Russian Place Names and Proposing Handling Opinions", demanded Heilongjiang Province to derussify place names within its jurisdiction. Subsequently, the Heilongjiang Provincial Department of Civil Affairs conducted studies and identified 20 Russian place names that were used in the past but now have Chinese names (mainly streets in Harbin, and islands on Amur River) and 9 Place names without Chinese names; then sent a written report to Beijing on December 27, 1963, containing suggestions for renaming Russian place names, as well as a note that some place names needed further study. On December 26, 1964, the State Council of the People's Republic of China approved the proposal for the derussification of place names.

After the collapse of the Soviet Union 
In most of the Central Asian and Transcaucasian republics of the former Soviet Union, the share and size of the Russian population fell particularly rapidly due to mass emigration, natural decline, and a prolonged population explosion among indigenous peoples who began to increase their presence in Russia as migrant workers.

Thus, in Tajikistan during the first ten years of independence, the number of Russians decreased from 400,000 to 60,000. In 2010, the Russian language in the republic was deprived of the status of a language of interethnic communication. The rapid derussification of many other cities and regions of Kazakhstan and Central Asia continues.

For example, the share of the Russian population in Astana between 1989 and 2009 fell from 54.5% to 24.9%; in Almaty from 59.1% to 33.2%; in Bishkek from 55.8% to 26.1%.

Transition from Cyrillic script 
Since the collapse of the Soviet Union, the number of countries officially using the Cyrillic script shrank, which can also be considered a sign of derussification. The script ceased to be used in Azerbaijan, Moldova, Turkmenistan and partly in Uzbekistan. In Kazakhstan, a complete transition of the Kazakh language from Cyrillic to Latin is scheduled by 2025.

In Turkmenistan 

All dedicated Russian-language schools were closed down, and their students sent to Turkmen schools across the country. The Turkmen government reduced Russian-language instruction to one hour a week, blocked most Russian-language media, and later curtailed access to Russian-language material in the national library.

In Kazakhstan 
Kazakhstan used Latin letters from 1929 to 1940, after which the country switched to Cyrillic during a reform. Prior to that, the Arabic script was used there.

On September 28, 2017, the Parliament of Kazakhstan held a hearing at which the draft of the new alphabet based on Latin was presented. The alphabet will consist of 25 characters. The project of the alphabet was presented by the director of the Coordination and Methodological Center of Language Development, Erbol Tleshev. According to him, the alphabet was compiled taking into account the language system of the Kazakh language and the opinions of experts. The Director of the Institute of Linguistics, Erden Kazybek, said that each letter of the alphabet will mean one sound and will not include additional graphic characters.

On October 27, 2017, President of Kazakhstan Nursultan Nazarbayev signed a decree on the translation of the Kazakh alphabet from Cyrillic to Latin. The document, published on October 27, envisages a gradual transition to Latin graphics by 2025. The decree also approved a new alphabet.

On February 26, 2018, during a meeting with the Minister of Information and Communications, Dauren Abayev, President of Kazakhstan Nursultan Nazarbayev ordered to translate the activities of the state authorities exclusively into the Kazakh language. This transition will take place in stages.

In Moldova 
Romanian is an official language in the Moldovan constitution since its independence, while Russian is still in use but not as important as it was in the Soviet era. However, Russian language has no special status in the country.

In Ukraine

In fact, the process began at the same time as the collapse of the USSR, but since the issue of decommunization was a much bigger problem, it received relatively little attention in a single dimension. These processes turned out to be closely connected and initially took place, mostly spontaneously and unsystematically. As the process of decommunization in Ukraine is almost over by 2022, after the beginning of the Russian invasion of Ukraine, some progress began in the issue of derussification.

Against the background of the Russian invasion of Ukraine in 2022, de-Russification began in Ukraine. In villages and towns, street names were changed and Soviet-Russian monuments were demolished. Not only architectural structures but also street names related to Russia have been de-Russified. Changes were made in Lviv, Dnipro, Kyiv and Kharkiv. In turn, Ivano-Frankivsk became the first city in Ukraine to be completely free of Russian place names.

As of April 8, 2022, according to a poll by the sociological group Rating, 76% of Ukrainians support the initiative to rename streets and other objects whose names are associated with Russia.

See also 
 Azerbaijanization of surnames
 Demolition of monuments to Alexander Pushkin in Ukraine
 Demolition of monuments to Vladimir Lenin in Ukraine
 KyivNotKiev

References 

 
Anti-Russian sentiment
Language policy